Rayón is a municipality located in Toluca Region, the northeastern part of the state of Mexico in Mexico, the municipal seat is Santa María Rayón, formerly named Cuauhtenco. The municipality is located at a southern pass leading out of the Toluca Valley.

Geography
The total municipality extends 84.37 km and borders with the municipalities of Tenango del Valle, Calimaya and Almoloya del Río.

Communication and transport 
The Lerma-Tenango Highway, is a main highway that cross by Rayón, connect with Toluca to Tenango del Valle.

Politics

Economy 
The economy is principally farming, cattle raising and small businesses, concentrating on the production of corn, beans and fruit.

Demography

Populated places in Rayón

Culture

Monuments 
Saint Mary of Guadalupe Parish is a monument in Rayón town.

References

Municipalities of the State of Mexico